The Antigua and Barbuda national football team is the national team of Antigua and Barbuda and is controlled by the Antigua and Barbuda Football Association, a member of the CONCACAF and the Caribbean Football Union (CFU).

History

First international match
On November 10th, 1972, Antigua and Barbuda's first match was a 1974 FIFA World Cup qualifying match versus Trinidad and Tobago in Port of Spain. The match was a 11-1 thrashing which to this day is this national team's worst defeat.

Friendlies against European teams
On 17 December 2005, the Antigua and Barbuda national team played their first match against a European opponent after the Hungarian Football Federation invited "the Benna Boys" to play Hungary in an international friendly at Lockhart Stadium in Fort Lauderdale, Florida. This was the first match coached by former national striker Derrick Edwards. Hungary defeated Antigua and Barbuda 3–0.

On 2 May 2016, the Estonian Football Association announced that their national team would play Antigua and Barbuda in an international friendly on 22 November. It was the team's second match against a European opponent. Estonia won the game 1–0.

2018 drug bust in Jamaica
During the March 2018 FIFA Calendar Antigua and Barbuda played Jamaica, drawing 1–1 away at Sabina Park, levelling in the last seconds of match from a header from Peter Byers. Upon the team's preparation for their departure back to Antigua, assistant coach Derrick Edwards and equipment manager Danny Benjamin were arrested and charged with possession of, dealing in, and taking steps to export marijuana, and conspiracy at the Norman Manley International Airport. Initially, Edwards was awarded bail and Benjamin was held without bail; after a month, both Edwards and Benjamin were placed under house arrest and curfew and gave up their travel documents. Both men were acquitted of the crime on 14 June, citing there was not enough evidence to prove their involvement in the carrying the drugs with the intention of smuggling them out of Jamaica.

Team image

Nicknames
The official nickname of the Antigua and Barbuda national football team is "the Benna Boys", due to the indigenous music of the country. The name was selected in a contest with the fanbase in 2012 after the team advanced to the third round of the 2014 World Cup qualifiers. "The Benna Boys" beat out other entries in the contest such as "Beach Boys", "Iron Bandits", "Rhythm Warriors" and "Party Crashers". In the past, the national team was unofficially known as "the Wadadli Boys", another name that was in the contest but did not win.

Kit suppliers

The kit of the national team has been manufactured by Spanish-based Joma since March 2021, ahead of the first round of the 2022 World Cup qualifiers.

Results and fixtures
The following is a list of match results in the last 12 months, as well as any future matches that have been scheduled.

2022

2023

Coaching staff

Current coaching staff

Manager history

The following is a list of head coaches of the Antigua and Barbuda national team throughout the years.

Players

Current squad
The following players were called up for the 2022–23 CONCACAF Nations League matches against Barbados, Guadeloupe and Cuba (twice) on 2, 5, 9 and 12 June 2022, respectively.

Caps and goals are correct as of 12 June 2022, after the match against Cuba.

Individual records

Players in bold are still active with Antigua and Barbuda.

Most appearances

Top goalscorers

Competitive record

FIFA World Cup

CONCACAF Gold Cup

CFU Caribbean Cup

***Red border color indicates that Antigua and Barbuda was the host nation.

Key

CONCACAF Nations League

Key

Head-to-head record
The following table shows Antigua and Barbuda's all-time official international record per opponent:

Key

Honours
 CFU Caribbean Championship & Caribbean Cup:
 Runners-up (1): 1988
 Fourth place (3): 1978, 1983, 1998

References

External links

 

 
Caribbean national association football teams